Diastanillus is a monotypic genus of European dwarf spiders containing the single species, Diastanillus pecuarius. It was first described by Eugène Louis Simon in 1926, and has only been found in Austria, France, and Norway.

See also
 List of Linyphiidae species

References

Linyphiidae
Monotypic Araneomorphae genera